Loka pri Zidanem Mostu is a village on the left bank of the Sava River in the Municipality of Sevnica in central Slovenia. The area is part of the historical region of Styria. The municipality is now included in the Lower Sava Statistical Region.

Name
The name of the settlement was changed from Loka to Loka pri Zidanem Mostu (literally, 'Loka near Zidani Most') in 1952. The toponym Loka is frequent in Slovenia and comes from the common noun loka 'flood-meadow', referring to the local geography.

Church
The parish church in the settlement is dedicated to Saint Helena and belongs to the Roman Catholic Diocese of Celje. It was originally a 13th-century church that was restyled in the Baroque in 1740.

Notable people
Notable people that were born or lived in Loka pri Zidanem Mostu include:
 Ivan Fon (1860–1912), education specialist and textbook author
 Ludvik Mrzel (1904–1971), writer, poet, and journalist
 Janko Prunk (born 1942), historian
 Ferdinand Ripšl (1820–1887), poet, orchardist, and local historian
 Zora Tavčar (born 1928), poet and writer
 Primož Trubar (1508–1586), Protestant preacher (served as priest in the village between 1529 and 1531)
 Alenka Rebula Tuta (born 1954), poet, author, and psychotherapist

Demographics

References

External links

Loka pri Zidanem Mostu on Geopedia

Populated places in the Municipality of Sevnica